Rémi Cusin (born 3 February 1986 in Saint-Julien en Genevois) is a French former professional road racing cyclist, who competed as a professional between 2009 and 2013. Cusin joined  for the 2010 and 2011 seasons, and in 2011 he scored his first UCI ProTour victory in the Tour of Denmark, where he won Stage 2.

Cusin retired at the end of the 2013 season.

Palmarès 

2009
2nd Le Samyn
7th, Les Boucles du Sud Ardèche
8th Overall Rhône-Alpes Isère Tour
2011
1st Stage 2 Danmark Rundt
8th Tour du Doubs
9th Overall Circuit de Lorraine
2012
6th Tour du Finistère
6th Overall Circuit de Lorraine
2013
3rd Tour de Berne
4th Tour du Finistère
5th Tro-Bro Léon
7th Grand Prix de Plumelec-Morbihan

Grand Tour general classification results timeline

References

External links 
 
 
 Rémi Cusin's profile on Cycling Base

French male cyclists
People from Saint-Julien-en-Genevois
1986 births
Living people
Université Savoie-Mont Blanc alumni
Sportspeople from Haute-Savoie
Cyclists from Auvergne-Rhône-Alpes